The Blue Wing Solar Project is a 16.6 MWp (14.4 MWAC) solar photovoltaic (PV) power plant in San Antonio, Texas.   It was one of the largest PV facilities in Texas when it  came online in late 2010 and is owned by a Duke Energy Subsidiary.

Project Details
The project covers  near the intersection of highways IH 37 and U.S. 181.  It has 214,500 solar photovoltaic modules manufactured by US firm First Solar that are mounted onto fixed-tilt (20deg) racks.  The plant is expected to produce more than 26 GWh of electricity per year.

The installation also includes a 500-kilowatt demonstration facility where a variety of other thin film and crystalline silicon PV modules, as well as a concentrator photovoltaic (CPV) unit, have been installed for evaluation and comparison purposes.

Electricity Production

See also

 List of photovoltaic power stations
 Renewable energy in the United States
 Renewable portfolio standard
 Solar power in the United States

References

External links
CPS website
Duke website

Energy infrastructure completed in 2010
Buildings and structures in San Antonio
Solar power stations in Texas
Photovoltaic power stations in the United States
2010 establishments in Texas
Duke Energy